JDS Yukishio (SS-581) was a. She was commissioned on 11 March 1988.

Construction and career
Yukishio was laid down at Mitsubishi Heavy Industries Kobe Shipyard on 11 April 1985 and launched on 23 January 1987. She was commissioned on 11 March 1988, into the 2nd Submarine Group in Yokosuka.

She participated in Hawaii dispatch training from September 21 to December 19, 1989.

On 9 March 2006, she was reclassified as a training submarine, her hull number changed to TSS-3605, she was transferred to the 1st training submarine under the direct control of the submarine fleet, and her fixed port was transferred to Kure.

In January 2006, she left Yokosuka for Dokai Bay, where the dismantling site is located.

Gallery

Citations

External links

1987 ships
Yūshio-class submarines
Ships built by Mitsubishi Heavy Industries